Luther's canon is the biblical canon attributed to Martin Luther, which has influenced Protestants since the 16th-century Protestant Reformation. While the Lutheran Confessions specifically did not define a biblical canon, it is widely regarded as the canon of the Lutheran Church. It differs from the 1546 Roman Catholic canon of the Council of Trent in that it rejects the deuterocanonical books and questions the seven New Testament books, called "Luther's Antilegomena", four of which are still ordered last in German-language Luther Bibles to this day.

Deuterocanonical books

Luther included the deuterocanonical books in his translation of the German Bible, but he did relocate them to after the Old Testament, calling them "Apocrypha, that are books which are not considered equal to the Holy Scriptures, but are useful and good to read."

Hebrews, James, Jude, and Revelation

Some Catholic sources state and certain historians contend that until the definition of the Council of Trent issued on April 8, 1546, the Roman Catholic Church had not yet dogmatically defined  the contents of the biblical canon for Catholics and thus settled the matter. In the 4th century the Council of Rome had outlined the books which now appear in the Catholic canon.

Luther considered  Hebrews, James, Jude, and the Revelation to be "disputed books", which he included in his translation but placed separately at the end in his New Testament published in 1522. This group of books begins with the book of Hebrews, and in its preface Luther states, "Up to this point we have had to do with the true and certain chief books of the New Testament. The four which follow have from ancient times had a different reputation." Some opine that Luther's low view of these books was due more to his theological reservations than to any historical basis regarding them.

In his book Basic Theology, Charles Caldwell Ryrie countered the claim that Luther rejected the Book of James as being non-canonical. In his preface to the New Testament, Luther ascribed to several books of the New Testament different degrees of doctrinal value:
 Thus Luther was comparing (in his opinion) doctrinal value, not canonical validity.

However, Ryrie's theory is countered by other biblical scholars, including William Barclay, who note that Luther stated plainly, if not bluntly: "I think highly of the epistle of James, and regard it as valuable although it was rejected in early days. It does not expound human doctrines, but lays much emphasis on God's law. […] I do not hold it to be of apostolic authorship."

Sola fide doctrine

In The Protestant Spirit of Luther’s Version, Philip Schaff asserts that:

Martin Luther's description of the Epistle of James changes. In some cases, Luther argues that it was not written by an apostle; but in other cases, he describes James as the work of an apostle. He even cites it as authoritative teaching from God and describes James as "a good book, because it sets up no doctrines of men but vigorously promulgates the law of God." Lutherans hold that the Epistle is rightly part of the New Testament, citing its authority in the Book of Concord.

Lutheran teachings resolve James' and Paul's verbal conflict regarding faith and works in alternate ways from the Catholics and E. Orthodox:

Similar canons at the time
In his book Canon of the New Testament, Bruce Metzger notes that in 1596 Jacob Lucius published a Bible at Hamburg which labeled as Apocrypha Luther's four Antilegomena: Hebrews, James, Jude and Revelation; Lucius explained this category of "Apocrypha" as "That is, books that are not held equal to the other holy Scripture". David Wolder, the pastor of Hamburg's Church of St. Peter, published in the same year a triglot Bible which labeled those books as "non canonical". J. Vogt published a Bible at Goslar in 1614 similar to Lucius'. In Sweden, Gustavus Adolphus published in 1618 the Gustavus Adolphus Bible with those four books labeled as "Apocr(yphal) New Testament." Metzger considers those decisions a "startling deviation among Lutheran editions of the Scriptures".

Usage among Nonconformist Protestants

References

Development of the Christian biblical canon
Canon
Canon
Christian terminology
Luther's Antilegomena